4th floor may refer to:

 The 4th Floor (1999 film), a 1999 horror film
 The 4th Floor (2003 film) or Planta 4ª, a 2003 comedy film
 For the floors of a building, see Storey.